The Professional Basketball Writers Association (PBWA) is a professional nonprofit organization for sportswriters and editors who write about professional basketball—including the National Basketball Association (NBA)—for newspapers, magazines and websites.

History
The idea of a professional organization like the PBWA began to be discussed in the early 1970s. One of the rationales was to improve working conditions. For NBA beat writers, the league did not have a specific policy regarding access to locker rooms, team practices, players, coaches, general managers, and other executives.

On January 18, 1972, interested sportswriters gathered formally for the first time, to begin organizing what was to become the Pro Basketball Writers Association of America (PBWAA). The meeting occurred at the Century Plaza Hotel, in Los Angeles, California, during the NBA All-Star Game weekend. The PBWAA organized formally one year later, on January 23, 1973, at a meeting in the O'Hare Hyatt Regency Hotel, in Chicago, Illinois.

Presidents
See footnote

1972–1974 – Joe Gilmartin, Phoenix Gazette
1974–1976 – Don Fair, Seattle Post Intelligencer
1976–1977 – George Cunningham, The Atlanta Journal-Constitution
1977–1980 – Steve Hersey, The Washington Star
1980–1982 – George White, Houston Chronicle
1982–1983 – Bob Ryan, The Boston Globe
1983–1985 – Fran Blinebury, Houston Chronicle
1985–1987 – Phil Jasner, Philadelphia Daily News
1987–1988 – Don Greenberg, Orange County Register
1988–1990 – Jan Hubbard, The Dallas Morning News
1990–1992 – Shaun Powell, Miami Herald
1992–1994 – Fred Kerber, New York Post
1994–1996 – Mike Kahn, The News-Tribune
1996–1997 – Mike Monroe, The Denver Post
1997–1999 – Dave D'Alessandro, The Star-Ledger
1999–2005 – Sam Smith, Chicago Tribune
2005–2007 – Steve Aschburner, Star Tribune
2008 – Rick Bonnell, The Charlotte Observer

Awards Held by PBWAA
Best Writing Contest  PBWA Blumenthal Memorial Writing Contest, which honors the best work by members of the Professional Basketball Writers. Chris Ballard, Kevin Ding, Jason Quick and Marc J. Spears were named first-place winners in 2015.
Brian McIntyre Award this Media Relations Award which is presented each season to an NBA media relations staff that best exemplifies the standards of professionalism and excellence worthy of acclaim. The media relations staff of Toronto Raptors won this award in the 2014–2015 season. The public relations staff of the Golden State Warriors was named the 2013–2014 winner and the public relations staff of the Indiana Pacers was named the winner of year 2012–2013.
J. Walter Kennedy Citizenship Award is an annual National Basketball Association (NBA) award given since 1975 to a player, coach, or staff member who shows "outstanding service and dedication to the community." Season of 2015–2016 Wayne Ellington of the Brooklyn Nets won this award. And the winner in the past were Samuel Dalembert (2009–2010), Ron Artest (2010–2011), Pau Gasol (2011–2012), Kenneth Faried (2012–2013), Luol Deng (2013–2014) and Joakim Noah (2014–2015). 	
Magic Johnson Award is an annual award for an NBA player who recognizes excellence on the court and cooperation and dignity with the media and public. In 2016 Stephen Curry was named the winner. The award, which was created in 2001, has been given to some of the league's most prominent players over the years, including Pau Gasol (2014–2015), Dirk Nowitzki (2013–2014), Kevin Durant (2010–2011), Chris Bosh (2009–2010), Grant Hill (2005–2006), and Ray Allen (2000–2001).
Rudy Tomjanovich Award presented annually to recognizes a coach for his cooperation with the media and fans, as well as his excellence on the court. The winner in 2016 was Dwane Casey of the Toronto Raptors. Steve Kerr of the Golden State Warriors won the season of 2014–2015 and Frank Vogel of the Indiana Pacers was voted for the season of 2013–2014.

See also
United States Basketball Writers Association (college)
Baseball Writers' Association of America (BBWAA)
National Collegiate Baseball Writers Association
Pro Football Writers Association
Football Writers Association of America (college)
Professional Hockey Writers Association
National Sportscasters and Sportswriters Association

Footnotes

External links

National Basketball Association mass media
Basketball mass media
American sports journalism organizations
Journalism-related professional associations
Sports organizations established in 1973